Italian submarine Turchese was a  built for the Royal Italian Navy (Regia Marina) during the 1930s. She was named after a gemstone Turquoise.

Design and description
The Perla-class submarines were essentially repeats of the preceding . The modifications that were made compared to the boats of the previous series were mostly of upgrade nature. Among them were enlargement of the false tower at the top, more modern engines, installation of a radiogoniometer that could be controlled from inside the ship. Improvements and the installation of new air conditioning equipment meant a slight increase in displacement, and increase in the fuel stowage also increased the autonomy of these boats compared to the previous series. Their designed full load displacement was  surfaced and  submerged, but varied somewhat depending on the boat and the builder.

When submerged each propeller was driven by a  electric motor. They could reach  on the surface and  underwater.

The boats were armed with six internal  torpedo tubes, four in the bow and two in the stern. One reload torpedo was carried for each tube, for a total of twelve. They were also armed with one  deck gun for combat on the surface. The light anti-aircraft armament consisted of one or two pairs of   machine guns.

Construction and career
Turchese was built by CRDA at their shipyard in Monfalcone, laid on 28 September 1935, launched on 19 July 1936, and completed on 21 September 1936.

After delivery, Turchese was assigned to the 34th Squadron (III Submarine group) based at Messina. After brief training, she carried out a long endurance cruise in the Dodecanese in the fall of 1936. In 1937 she carried out a training campaign in the Dodecanese and the Mediterranean, followed by another one in 1938. On October 15, 1938, she was temporarily assigned to Flotilla Submarine school. Turchese remained assigned to this Squadron until the end of her career.

After the outbreak of hostilities Turchese was under command of Gustavo Miniero. She carried out her first war mission in patrol off Cap de Creus June 17–19, 1940 without sighting any enemy ships.

During her war career Turchese conducted many uneventful patrols in the Strait of Sicily and near the North African coast.

On July 12, 1940, on her return journey to Cagliari, she sighted an enemy ship which appeared to be laying mines, and launched three torpedoes at the target. One torpedo missed, and the other two passed under the hull of the ship without exploding, while the ship moved away at full speed.

Italian submarines stayed on patrol until August 9, however, Force H passed north of the area patrolled by Italian submarines, and they were not able to detect it.

south of the Balearic Islands with the task of intercepting part of Force H which left Gibraltar participating in British Operation "Baritone". Submarines did not, however, sight any British vessels that took a different path and then returned to the base.

On November 8, 1942 Operation Torch was launched: more than 500 British and American vessels escorted by 350 warships began landing 107,000 troops on the coasts of Algeria and Morocco, thus opening the second front in North Africa. Together with many other Italian and German submarines Turchese was immediately dispatched to the southern Mediterranean.

On September 7, 1943, under the provisions of Zeta Plan, many Italian submarines were deployed in the Tyrrhenian Sea to intercept an anticipated Anglo-American landing in southern Italy. Turchese patrolled in an area between the Gulf of Gaeta and the Gulf of Paola.

The following day, following the proclamation of the Armistice, Turchese was instructed to sail to Bona, Algeria to surrender to the Allies. At 21:27 on September 11, however, she was attacked by a German aircraft and hit, sustaining serious damage, so that she had to be towed by a British vessel. She arrived in tow at Bona on September 13, 1943.

After doing temporary repairs, she left Bona in the afternoon of September 27, but shortly thereafter her engines stopped working and the submarine had to turn back and arrived at Bona at 7:30 the following day. From there Turchese went to Bizerta and then to Malta, where she arrived on October 6.

On November 27, 1943 Turchese left Malta towed by corvette , first coming to Augusta then to Taranto, and finally to Brindisi.

Turchese never returned to service and spent the rest of the conflict disarmed in Brindisi. She was struck on February 1, 1948, and subsequently scrapped.

Notes

References 
 

Perla-class submarines
World War II submarines of Italy
1936 ships
Ships built by Cantieri Riuniti dell'Adriatico
Ships built in Monfalcone